Miraglossum is a genus of plants in the family Apocynaceae, first described as a genus in 1984. It is native to southern Africa.

Species
 Miraglossum anomalum (N.E. Br.) Kupicha - South Africa 
 Miraglossum davyi (N.E. Br.) Kupicha - South Africa 
 Miraglossum laeve Kupicha - Limpopo, Mpumalanga, Gauteng 
 Miraglossum pilosum (Schltr.) Kupicha - KwaZulu-Natal  
 Miraglossum pulchellum (Schltr.) Kupicha - Eswatini, Gauteng
 Miraglossum superbum Kupicha - KwaZulu-Natal  
 Miraglossum verticillare (Schltr.) Kupicha  - KwaZulu-Natal

References

Flora of Southern Africa
Asclepiadoideae
Apocynaceae genera